Christopher Norris is an American movie and television actress. She is probably best known for her portrayal of nurse Gloria "Ripples" Brancusi in the television series Trapper John, M.D.. She attended Los Angeles Valley College. 

Early notable roles include the wild girl Miriam in Summer of '42 (1971); a heroic young flight attendant in the disaster film Airport 1975 (1974), and as a hot girl in Roger Corman's Eat My Dust! (1976). Early in her career, Norris typically played wholesome, "girl next door" types, and, later in her career, she got more "vixen" type roles, including the role of loony Laura Simmons Asher on the daytime soap Santa Barbara. Her other daytime credits include Another World and Guiding Light.

In 1980, Norris married Walter Danley, a businessman and later novelist. They divorced in 1998.

Due to their physical resemblance, Norris is frequently mistaken for Melanie Griffith. Because of this, Griffith was mistakenly interviewed in the 1990s by the British media about acting in Airport 1975. 

In the 1990s, Norris took a break from acting and graduated with a degree in psychology from Antioch University. 

She is also an antique collector.

Filmography

Television

Notes

External links
 

Living people
American film actresses
American television actresses
Actresses from New York City
American soap opera actresses
20th-century American actresses
Los Angeles Valley College people
Antioch University alumni
21st-century American women
Year of birth missing (living people)